One Fine Spring Day is a South Korean feature film released by Sidus and Applause Films in 2001. Directed by Hur Jin-ho (of Christmas in August), the film is a portrait of a love affair - from its blossoming in spring, to its decline as the years pass.

Plot
Sound engineer Sang-woo meets local DJ Eun-soo on a recording trip in the quest for nature's voice. They succeed in capturing various sensual sounds as well as each other's tenderness. Their love flourishes as spring comes along, but Sang-woo's ever intensifying passion often reminds Eun-soo of her tragic past. She knows only too well how passion can vanish like a sound, and how love always surrenders to its end.

Popular culture
The character Eun-soo, portrayed by Lee Young-ae was the first to say the phrase "Do you want to eat ramyeon?", which later grew to exemplify a pick-up line meaning, "Do you want to sleep with me?". It was followed by a scene with broken hearted Sang-woo (Yoo Ji-tae), being offered soju with his ramyeon by his father.

Cast
Yoo Ji-tae as Sang-woo
Lee Young-ae as Eun-soo
Baek Seong-hee
Park In-hwan
Shin Shin-ae as aunt
Baek Jong-hak
Son Young-soon
Lee Moon-sik as recording studio senior
Park Seon-woo
Gang Hwa-sun

Awards
2001 Baeksang Arts Awards
Best Director - Hur Jin-ho

2001 Busan Film Critics Awards
Best Film
Best Actress - Lee Young-ae
Best Director - Hur Jin-ho

2001 Tokyo International Film Festival
Best Art Direction - Park Il-hyun

2001 Blue Dragon Film Awards
Best Film

2001 Korean Association of Film Critics Awards
Best Film
Best Cinematography - Kim Hyung-koo

References

External links

One Fine Spring Day at Applause Films (co-production company)

Best Picture Blue Dragon Film Award winners
2000s Korean-language films
2001 romantic drama films
South Korean romantic drama films
Films directed by Hur Jin-ho
2000s South Korean films